Rennau is a municipality in the district of Helmstedt, in Lower Saxony, Germany. The Municipality Rennau includes the villages of Ahmstorf, Rennau and Rottorf am Klei.

References

Helmstedt (district)